"Osiedle Młodych" is also the name of the housing cooperative administering much of Rataje, Poznań.

Osiedle Młodych (meaning "Estate of the Young") is one of the districts of the Polish city of Białystok.

External links
 

Mlodych